Posyolok Torfopredpriyatiya is a rural locality (a settlement) in Karinskoye Rural Settlement, Alexandrovsky District, Vladimir Oblast, Russia. The population was 10 as of 2010. There is 1 street.

Geography 
The settlement is located 16 km south of Alexandrov (the district's administrative centre) by road. Rykulino is the nearest rural locality.

References 

Rural localities in Alexandrovsky District, Vladimir Oblast